The Bell D-292 was an American experimental helicopter developed by Bell Helicopters for the United States Army Advanced Composite Airframe Program (ACAP), as part of the studies involved in the Light Helicopter Experimental (LHX) program.

Design and development

The Bell D-292 was developed under the US Army's Advanced Composite Airframe Program (ACAP), which was a project to develop an all-composite helicopter fuselage, considerably lighter and less costly to build than predominantly metal airframes, in support of the LHX program. In February 1981, contracts were awarded to Sikorsky and Bell Helicopters, with Sikorsky submitting the S-75. Both companies were to build three airframes, one tool-proof version, one static-test version and a flight-test vehicle.

The Bell D-292 used the Avco Lycoming engines, transmission, two-bladed main and tail rotors, tailboom, vertical fin, and rotor pylon from the Bell 222. The new airframe replaced metal with composites for greater strength, reduced weight and both lower manufacturing and maintenance costs.

The D-292 serial number 85-24371 flew for the first time on 30 August 1985 following delays due to funding and industrial problems.

Specifications

See also

References

Notes

Bibliography

1980s United States helicopters
1980s United States experimental aircraft
Twin-turbine helicopters
Aircraft first flown in 1985
D-292